KIC may represent:

 The IATA airport code for Mesa Del Rey Airport
 The ICAO airline code for Kiwi Travel International Airlines
 The ISO 639-3 language code for Kickapoo, see ISO 639:kic
 Kepler Input Catalog of stars
 ketoisocaproate, the ketoacid of leucine
 Korea Investment Corporation
 Kansas Insurance Commissioner
 Kohler International Challenge
 Kobe Institute of Computing
 Kashyap information criterion
 Keep Islip Clean
 KIC Group, the parent of Eastar Jet airline
  Knowledge and Innovation Community, see European Institute of Innovation and Technology

See also
 KICS